Eudonia dactyliopa is a moth of the family Crambidae. It is endemic to the Hawaiian islands of Oahu and Molokai.

The larvae feed on moss.

External links

Eudonia
Endemic moths of Hawaii
Biota of Oahu
Biota of Molokai
Moths described in 1899